The 2001 Liga Perdana 1 season is the fourth season of Liga Perdana 1. A total of 12 teams participated in the season.

The season kicked off on March 31, 2001. Penang dominated the season and ended up winning the title.

Teams
A total of 12 teams participated in the 2001 Liga Perdana 1 season. 12 teams competing in the fourth season of Liga Perdana 1. Malacca and Kelantan were promoted while Sabah and Brunei were relegated to Liga Perdana 2.

 Selangor FA (2000 Liga Perdana 1 champions)
 Penang FA 
 Perak FA
 Terengganu FA
 Sarawak FA
 Negeri Sembilan FA
 Pahang FA
 Kuala Lumpur FA
 Perlis FA
 Johor FC 
 Kelantan FA (Promoted as 2000 Liga Perdana 2 champions)
 Malacca FA (Promoted as 2000 Liga Perdana 2 runner-up)

League table

Champions

References

Liga Perdana 1 seasons
1
Malaysia